Sobekemsaf (sbk-m-z3(w)=f; “Sobek is his protection”) was an ancient Egyptian official of the Thirteenth Dynasty, around 1700 BC. He is especially well known from his statue in Vienna.

Family
Sobekemsaf came from an influential family. His father was the scribe of the vizier Dedusobek Bebi. His mother was a certain Duanofert. His uncle Nebankh, the brother of his father was high steward under Sobekhotep IV, and therefore one of the most influential officials at the royal court. The sister of Sobekemsaf was the queen Nubkhaes. She evidently managed to marry into the royal family, or her husband managed to become king. Albeit her royal husband is not yet identified for sure.

Attestation

Sobekemsaf appears on several monuments. They include a stela now in the Louvre in Paris (C13), a statue in Berlin (Inv. no. 2285), a stela in the Egyptian Museum in Cairo (CG 20763) and the almost lifesize statue today in Vienna, in the Kunsthistorisches Museum (inv. no. 5801). The base of the statue is in Dublin National Museum of Ireland, Reg. No. 1889.503. On his monuments Sobekemsaf bears two titles. On the stelae in Cairo and Vienna as well as on the statue in Berlin he bears the title overseer of the granaries. On the statue in Vienna he has the title reporter of Thebes (wHmw n w3st), being evidently promoted in the between times.

The Vienna statue is an important, high quality artwork. Its dating was for a long time under discussion. It was known that Sobekemsaf is the brother of a queen Nubkhaes. However, there is also a queen with the same name, known as the wife of the 17th Dynasty king Sobekemsaf II. Therefore, it was an open question whether the statue and Sobekemsaf  belong to the 13th or 17th Dynasty. However, today, there is a general agreement, that Sobekemsaf  dates to the 13th Dynasty, shortly after Sobekhotep IV, as most of his family members are datable around this reign.

References 

People of the Thirteenth Dynasty of Egypt
Officials of the Thirteenth Dynasty of Egypt
Ancient Egyptian overseers of the granaries